Tel Afar District is a district in Nineveh Governorate, Iraq. Its administrative center is the city of Tal Afar. Other towns include Rabia, Zummar, and al-Ayadia. It is predominantly populated by Iraqi Turkmens, followed by minorities of Arabs and Kurds.

References

Districts of Nineveh Governorate